Sami Jasem Al-Dosari (born 11 March 1965) is a Saudi Arabian footballer. He competed in the men's tournament at the 1984 Summer Olympics.

References

External links
 
 

1965 births
Living people
Saudi Arabian footballers
Saudi Arabia international footballers
Olympic footballers of Saudi Arabia
Footballers at the 1984 Summer Olympics
Saudi Professional League players
Ettifaq FC players
Place of birth missing (living people)
Association football defenders